Orders of the Ermine may refer to:

 Order of the Ermine (France), a chivalric order
 Order of the Ermine (Naples), a chivalric order
 Order of the Ermine (modern), awarded for services to Brittany